This is about the village in India.  For the valley in Pakistan, see Bandala Valley.

Bandala, also spelt as Bundala, is a large village in Amritsar district  situated in Amritsar within the Indian state of Punjab.

Demographics
The village is home to 10,683 people, among them 5593 (52%) are male and 5090 (48%) are female. 66% of the whole population are from general caste, 34% are from schedule caste. Child (aged under 6 years) population of Bandala village is 12%, among them 56% are boys and 44% are girls. There are 1999 households in the village.

Literacy
Total 6607 people in the village are literate, among them 3629 are male and 2978 are female. Literacy rate (children under 6 are excluded) of Bandala is 70%. 74% of male and 66% of female population are literate here.

References 

Villages in Amritsar district